Rallying in Italy is a fairly well-practiced motorsport. Italian drivers have become the World Rally Champions twice in history; both were Miki Biasion in the years 1988 and 1989. In 1977, Sandro Munari won the FIA Cup for Drivers (unofficial World Rally Championship Drivers' champion). Italians have also achieved 30 rally wins, the last of which with Piero Liatti at the Monte Carlo Rally in 1997.

World Rally Championship

Rally wins in WRC

Italians at the World Rally Championship

Italian Rally Championship

The Italian Rally Championship is held since 1961.

See also
 List of World Rally Championship records
 Lancia in rallying
Rallye Sanremo
Rally Italia Sardegna
Monza Rally Show

References

External links
 Driver wins per nationalities at Juwra.com